
Gmina Pobiedziska is an urban-rural gmina (administrative district) in Poznań County, Greater Poland Voivodeship, in west-central Poland.

As of 2006 the total population of the gmina is 16,382 (out of which the population of Pobiedziska amounts to 8,329, and the population of the rural part of the gmina is 8,053).

Villages
Apart from the town of Pobiedziska, the gmina contains the villages and settlements of Bednary, Biskupice, Bociniec, Borowo-Młyn, Bugaj, Czachurki, Główna, Gołunin, Góra, Jankowo, Jerzykowo, Jerzyn, Kocanowo, Kociałkowa Górka, Kołata, Kowalskie, Krześlice, Łagiewniki, Latalice, Podarzewo, Polska Wieś, Pomarzanowice, Promno, Pruszewiec, Stara Górka, Stęszewko, Tuczno, Uzarzewo-Huby, Wagowo, Węglewo, Wójtostwo, Wronczyn, Zbierkowo and Złotniczki.

Neighbouring gminas
Gmina Pobiedziska is bordered by the gminas of Czerniejewo, Czerwonak, Kiszkowo, Kostrzyn, Łubowo, Murowana Goślina, Nekla and Swarzędz.

References
Polish official population figures 2006

Pobiedziska
Poznań County